Sea-Steeds and Wave Riders is a 1978 role-playing game supplement published by Judges Guild.

Contents
Sea-Steeds and Wave Riders is a supplement in which more than 20 descriptions of ancient and medieval ships are included.

Publication history
Sea-Steeds and Wave-Riders was written by Dave Sering and published by Judges Guild in 1978 as 32-page book with two large maps.

Reception
Patrick Amory reviewed Sea-Steeds and Wave Riders for Different Worlds magazine and stated that "The maps are well-produced and stand up to a lot of wear. Also included is a long piece on crews, ship-captains, and prices. An invaluable aid for any serious GM."

Reviews
White Wolf #39 (1994)
Dragon #133

References

Fantasy role-playing game supplements
Judges Guild publications
Role-playing game supplements introduced in 1978